Richard Abanes (born October 13, 1961) is an American writer and actor. As an author/journalist, Abanes specializes in the area of socio-religious issues, cults, the occult, world religions, the entertainment industry, and pop culture. Since 1994 he has written/co-written twenty books (as of 2009) covering a broad range of topics.

In 1997, for his work on intolerance in North America (see American Militias: Rebellion, Racism, and Religion, InterVarsity Press, 1996), he received an award from The Gustavus Myers Center for the Study of Bigotry and Human Rights. Also in 1997, Abanes won the Evangelical Press Association's Higher Goals In Journalism Award for his article on the various religions in America. This volume is currently being used as cited source material in teaching/training literature distributed by: the Combating Terrorism Center at West Point; the Naval Postgraduate School Center for Homeland Defense and Security; the U.S. Dept. of Defense; and the Center for Complex Operations, U.S. National Defense University.

As a lecturer on diverse social, religious, and historical topics, he has been a guest speaker at various institutions, including the Simon Wiesenthal Center, Caltech, Mensa, California Baptist University, and Biola University. Abanes also has been interviewed on various radio and TV programs and networks including the BBC, MSNBC, CNN, Extra, and Hard Copy as an authority on cults, religion, pop culture, and the entertainment industry.

Career 
Abanes began his career as a professional singer, dancer, and actor (with Screen Actors Guild and Actors' Equity Association) in local theater (Rockford, Illinois) at the age of thirteen. He began doing semi-professional theater within a year, and during his high school years he was featured in many productions throughout Northern Illinois including West Side Story, Fiddler On the Roof, and You're a Good Man, Charlie Brown. He also became a featured dancer in the Rockford Dance Company, while simultaneously studying dance in Chicago with professional companies such as The Hubbard Street Dancers and Joel Hall Studios.

Abanes subsequently moved to New York, where he landed a role in the "International" and "Bus & Truck" companies of the hit Broadway musical A Chorus Line. Soon afterwards, Abanes was given a featured dance role on Broadway in the musical Dreamgirls. In the years that followed, Abanes was featured in national television commercials such as Canada Dry, Wendy's, and Nissan. He also played the lead role in an ABC Afterschool Special, co-starred in the film Rappin''', and starred in the Bill Moyers PBS special titled "The Constitution." While in New York, he continued his studies in dance with American Dance Machine, Alvin Ailey Dance Center, American Ballet Theatre, Luigi's Jazz Center, Rick Atwell, and Ann Reinking.

Abanes eventually began to pursue a second career as a full-time freelance journalist. This led to his first book, Prophets of the Apocalypse: David Koresh and Other American Messiahs, which was co-authored with three other writers and published in 1994 (Baker Books). He would go on to write 19 more books, the last of which was published in 2009 (see bibliography).

In 1998, while continuing his writing pursuits, Abanes joined the staff of Saddleback Church (Rick Warren, pastor) as its Creative Arts Director and assistant music minister. While serving at Saddleback, Abanes: taught Bible studies; write/directed productions involving the Drama Ministry and dance ministry; gave acting classes; and led worship services. He also produced two CD albums of original contemporary Christian music ("Hold On" and "Everlasting Love") that together sold nearly 100,000 copies. (A third CD titled "There Is A God," a combination of tracks from his first two albums, is now distributed through Watchfire Music). He eventually left Saddleback in 2000 in order to devote more time to writing (see Marc Gunther, “Will Success Spoil Rick Warren?," CNN, October 31, 2005) 

As of 2010, in addition to being an active author/journalist, Abanes was again working in the field of show business as a singer, dancer, and actor. In July of that year, he performed the role of Judas in Jesus Christ Superstar with Rockford's Bonzi Productions. Abanes has since appeared on New York stages in a production "Song of Solomon" (written by Andrew Beall & Neil Van Leeuwen), "Yes! The Musical" (originally produced in showcase form by The Duke Ellington Center for the Arts), and "Pearl: The Musical" (based on the life of Pearl Bailey). In this latter show (directed by Tony Award winner, Ben Harney), Abanes played multiple roles including entertainment legends Bob Hope, Johnny Mercer, Frank Sinatra, and Andy Williams. He was most recently seen in 2022 in the Off-Broadway producer's staged reading of the new musical, "Goodbye New York," by Andrew Beall, Evan McCormick, and David Don Miller (see "Goodbye, New York" from Broadway World). 

As of 2023, Abanes was still working in the entertainment industry not only as a performer, but also as a playwright. His first play, "Five Women," is currently in production under the guidance of New York producer, Jay Michaels. His first musical, "Carly," is slated to be produced and staged in New York by late 2023/early 2024.

 BibliographyReligions of the Stars
A New Earth, An Old Deception
He Is Risen: Reflections On Easter & the Forty Days of Lent
Homeland Insecurity: A Novel
What Every Parent Needs to Know About Video Games
Rick Warren and the Purpose that Drives Him
Harry Potter, Narnia, and The Lord of the Rings
The Truth Behind the Da Vinci Codel
Becoming Gods: A Closer Look at 21st Century Mormonism; re-titled and re-covered as Inside Today's Mormonism
One Nation Under Gods: A History of the Mormon Church; paperback edition
Fantasy and Your Family; revised, updated, and expanded into Harry Potter, Narnia, and The Lord of the Rings (see above).
Harry Potter and the Bible
Defending the Faith: A Beginner's Guide to Cults and New Religions
Cults, New Religious Movements, and Your Family
End-Time Visions: The Road to Armageddon?; paperback edition titled End-Time Visions: The Doomsday Obsession
American Militias: Rebellion, Racism & Religion
Journey into the Light
The Less Traveled Road and the Bible
Embraced by the Light and the Bible
Prophets of the Apocalypse: David Koresh and Other American Messiahs

References

American Christian writers
Living people
Critics of Mormonism
Place of birth missing (living people)
American male stage actors
Researchers of new religious movements and cults
1961 births